Elections were held in the organized municipalities in the Manitoulin District of Ontario on October 24, 2022 in conjunction with municipal elections across the province.

Assiginack
The following were the results for mayor of Assiginack.

Billings
Bryan William Barker was acclaimed as mayor of Billings.

Burpee and Mills
Ken Noland was re-elected as reeve of Burpee and Mills by acclamation.

Central Manitoulin
The following were the results for mayor of Central Manitoulin.

Cockburn Island
The following were the results for mayor of Cockburn Island.

Gordon/Barrie Island
Elections were not held in Gordon/Barrie Island as the entire council was acclaimed.

Gore Bay
The following were the results for mayor of Gore Bay.

Northeastern Manitoulin and the Islands
Mayor Al MacNevin was re-elected by acclamation.

Tehkummah
The following were the results for mayor of Tehkummah.

References

Manitoulin
Manitoulin District